John Gow (1698–1725) was a Scottish pirate.

John may also refer to:
 John Graham Gow (1850–1917), New Zealand commercial traveller and government trade representative
 John Gow (footballer, born 1859), Scottish football (soccer) player (Queen's Park FC and Scotland)
 John Gow (footballer, born 1869), Scottish football (soccer) player (Rangers FC and Scotland)
 John Gow (skier), Canadian para-alpine skier